The following lists events that happened during 1982 in New Zealand.

Population
 Estimated population as of 31 December: 3,226,800
 Increase since 31 December 1981: 32,300 (1.01%)
 Males per 100 females: 98.6

Regal and viceregal
Head of State – Elizabeth II
Governor-General – The Hon Sir David Beattie GCMG GCVO QSO QC.

Government
The 40th New Zealand Parliament continued. The third National Party government was in power.

Speaker of the House – Richard Harrison
Prime Minister – Robert Muldoon
Deputy Prime Minister – Duncan MacIntyre
Minister of Finance – Robert Muldoon
Minister of Foreign Affairs – Warren Cooper
Chief Justice — Sir Ronald Davison

Parliamentary opposition
 Leader of the Opposition –  Bill Rowling (Labour) until 3 February, then David Lange.
Social Credit Party – Bruce Beetham

Main centre leaders
Mayor of Auckland – Colin Kay
Mayor of Hamilton – Ross Jansen
Mayor of Wellington – Michael Fowler
Mayor of Christchurch – Hamish Hay
Mayor of Dunedin – Cliff Skeggs

Events
The first Kohanga reo kindergarten, Pukeatua, opens at Wainuiomata. Within 12 years there were more than 800 nationwide.
Social Credit forms an agreement with National to back the Clyde Dam (a Think Big project) in exchange for policy concessions.
The Clutha Development (Clyde Dam) Empowerment Act was passed, overriding the High Court and Planning Tribunal.
The proposed aluminium smelter at Aramoana was cancelled.
The Social Credit Political League changes its name to the Social Credit Party.
New Zealand provided assistance to the British during the Falklands War, primarily by taking over routine patrol duties elsewhere to free up British military resources.
The Warehouse opens its first store, in Takapuna.
  January: The third Sweetwaters Music Festival is held near Pukekawa.
3 February: David Lange succeeds Bill Rowling as Leader of the Opposition.
 4 April: New Zealand breaks diplomatic relations with Argentina over the Falklands Crisis.
22 June: Robert Muldoon announces a 12-month wage and price freeze. The freeze actually lasts almost two years.
14 September: Samoans who take up permanent residence in New Zealand are entitled to New Zealand citizenship from this date. This follows a case referred to the Privy Council which decided in July 1982 to allow all Samoans born under New Zealand administration (i.e. prior to 1962) to claim New Zealand citizenship.
 November:  Mark Inglis and Philip Doole are stuck in an ice cave on Aoraki / Mount Cook for 14 days.
18 November: a suicide bomb attack was made against a facility housing the main computer database of the New Zealand Police in Wanganui by a "punk rock" anarchist named Neil Roberts. He was the only person killed, and the computer system was undamaged, see Terrorism in New Zealand.
14 December: Robert Muldoon signs a "Heads of Agreement" with Australia to allow the Closer Economic Relations agreement to come into force at the beginning of 1983.

Arts and literature
William Sewell wins the Robert Burns Fellowship

See 1982 in art, 1982 in literature, :Category:1982 books

Music
 DD Smash produce their debut album, Cool Bananas.

New Zealand Music Awards
Winners are shown first and in boldface with nominees underneath. 
 Album of the year:    DD Smash – Cool Bananas
 Single of the year:  Prince Tui Teka – E Ipo
 Top male vocalist:   Dave Dobbyn (DD Smash) 
Malcolm McNeill
Monte Video
 Top female vocalist:   Patsy Riggir 
Suzanne Prentice
 Trudi Green (The Neighbours)
 Top group of the year:   DD Smash 
Herbs
The Narcs
 Most promising male vocalist:   Dave Dobbyn (DD Smash) 
 Most promising female vocalist:   Jodi Vaughan 
 Most promising group:   Dance Exponents 
 Polynesian record of the year:   Prince Tui Teka – E Ipo 
 Producer of the year:   Ian Morris – Cool Bananas (DD Smash) 
 Engineer of the year:   Paul Streekstra & Doug Rogers – Cool Bananas (DD Smash) 
 Sleeve design of the year:   Wayne Robinson –Cool Bananas (DD Smash) 
 Outstanding contribution to music:   Simon Grigg 

See: 1982 in music

Performing arts

 Benny Award presented by the Variety Artists Club of New Zealand to Don Linden.

Radio and television
 FM Stereo transmissions were being tested.  Radio Bay of Plenty Limited, operating 1XX (previously 1240 am then 1242 am in 1978) also in Whakatane, ran the first of many short-term summer stations.
 1XX – FM 90.7 This station was the 1ST licensed FM Stereo Radio station in New Zealand.  The station went to air at 4 pm on 5 January 1982 and went through to 31 January 1982 with the station on-air each day in two shifts: 4 pm – 8 pm & 8 pm – 12 am Midnight. Announcers: Chris Clarke,
 Te Karere, a Māori language news program, is trialled.
 Northern Television begins broadcasting morning television programs.  
Feltex Television Awards:
Best Information: Country Calendar
Best Documentary: Landmarks
Best News and Current Affairs: Close Up
Best Entertainment: Gliding On
Best Drama: Under the Mountain
Best Speciality: Kaleidoscope
Best Children's: Wild Track
Best New Talent: Olly Ohlson in After School
Best Actress: Susan Wilson in Mortimer's Patch and Gliding On
Best Actor: Bruce Allpress in Jocko
Steve Hosgood Award for Allied Craft: Robert Brown, cameraman
Best Television Entertainer: David McPhail and Jon Gadsby
Special Award: Ian Watkin for Service to the Industry
Best Script: Cry Wolf from Open File

See: 1982 in New Zealand television, 1982 in television, List of TVNZ television programming, :Category:Television in New Zealand, :Category:New Zealand television shows, Public broadcasting in New Zealand

Film
Carry Me Back
Battletruck
The Scarecrow

See: :Category:1982 film awards, 1982 in film, List of New Zealand feature films, Cinema of New Zealand, :Category:1982 films

Sport

Athletics
 Trevor Wright wins his first national title in the men's marathon, clocking 2:19:34 on 3 April in Whangarei.

Basketball
 Inaugural season of the NZ National Basketball League, won by Auckland.

Commonwealth Games

Horse racing

Harness racing
 New Zealand Trotting Cup: Bonnie's Chance
 Auckland Trotting Cup (2700m): Gammalite
ROWING

New Zealand men's rowing 8 win gold medal at the world rowing championships in Lucerne, Switzerland.

Stephanie Foster wins the first ever NZ women's medal at a world championships with a bronze medal in the single sculls event.

Rugby union
 Australia tours and play 3 tests. These are won 2–1 by New Zealand, who win back the Bledisloe Cup
 Lion National Provincial Championship:
Division 1: Auckland
Division 2 (North): Taranaki
Division 2 (south): Southland
 The North vs South match is played in Wanganui and is won 22-12 by South.

Shooting
 Ballinger Belt – John Hastie (Okawa)

Soccer
The All Whites reach the Football World Cup Finals in Barcelona, but lose all three games.
 New Zealand National Soccer League won by Mount Wellington
 The Chatham Cup is won by Mount Wellington who beat Miramar Rangers 1—0 after extra time in the final.

Births

January to June
 6 January – Roy Asotasi, rugby league player.
 12 January – Tony Lochhead, football (soccer) player.
 17 January – Tim Weston, cricketer.
 30 January – Shontayne Hape, rugby league player.
 1 February – Sam Tuitupou, rugby union player.
 5 March – Dan Carter, rugby union player.
 6 March – Jimmy Cowan, rugby union player.
 20 March – Rory Fallon, football (soccer) player.
 22 March – Chris Smylie, rugby player.
 24 March – James Napier, actor.
 4 April – Andrea Hewitt, athlete.
 19 April – Sitiveni Sivivatu, rugby union and sevens player.
 3 May – Casey Laulala, rugby union player.
 6 May – Eric Murray, rower, Olympic gold medallist (2012 London)
 13 May – Mika Vukona, basketball player.
 16 May – Jonathan Duncan, swimmer.
 21 May – Ma'a Nonu, rugby union player.
 22 June – Stu Mills, cricketer.

July to December
 1 July – James Pritchett, football (soccer) player.
 4 July – Jeff Lima, rugby league player.
 6 July – Jeremy Yates, cyclist.
 15 July – Neemia Tialata, rugby union player.
 17 July – Eve van Grafhorst.
 24 July – Anna Paquin, actress.
 4 August – Juliette Haigh, rower, Olympic bronze medallist (2012 London)
 15 August – Jason Eaton, rugby union player.
 30 August – Russell Ward, skeleton racer.
 7 September – Krystal Forgesson, field hockey player.
 16 September – Lizzy Igasan, field hockey defender.
 29 September – Joline Henry, netball player.
 11 October – Cameron Knowles, football (soccer) player.
 14 November – Sailosi Tagicakibau, Samoan rugby player
 17 November – Hollie Smith, singer-songwriter.
:Category:1982 births

Deaths
 3 January 1982: Bernard O'Brien, philosopher and theologian.
 18 February: Dame Ngaio Marsh writer and director.
 1 March: Frank Gill, Air Commodore, politician.
 1 March: Frank Sargeson, writer.
 24 May: William Sheat, politician.
 4 March (in London): Dorothy Eden, novelist.
 29 April: Ray Boord, politician.
 9 June (in Canada): Richard St. Barbe Baker, silviculturist and conservationist.
 11 June: Sir Valdemar Skellerup, industrialist.
 13 June: John A. Lee politician and writer.
 15 July: Don Beard, cricketer.
 2 September: Clive Hulme, Victoria Cross winner.
 19 September: Ted Badcock, cricketer.
 8 October: Cora Wilding, physiotherapist and artist.
 14 October: Andrew Davidson, educationalist
 1 November (in Canada): Eric Arthur, architect.
 22 November (in Majorca, Spain): Jean Batten aviator.
 2 December: Sir Robert Macfarlane, politician.
 18 December: Ray Emery, cricketer.

See also
List of years in New Zealand
Timeline of New Zealand history
History of New Zealand
Military history of New Zealand
Timeline of the New Zealand environment
Timeline of New Zealand's links with Antarctica

References

External links

 
New Zealand
Years of the 20th century in New Zealand